Gainesville is the name of several places in the United States of America:

 Gainesville, Alabama
 Gainesville, Arkansas
 Gainesville, Florida, the largest municipality with this name
 Gainesville, Georgia
 Gainesville, Missouri
 Gainesville (town), New York
 Gainesville (village), New York, a village within the town of Gainesville
 Gainesville, Texas
 Gainesville, Virginia

See also
Gainesville station (disambiguation)